Wild Dreams is the twelfth studio album by Irish pop vocal band Westlife. It was released on 26 November 2021 by East West Records, their first release on the label. The album was preceded by the lead single "Starlight", released on 14 October 2021. Its second single, "My Hero", was released on 5 November 2021. Wild Dreams includes songwriting contributions from Ed Sheeran ("My Hero") and Amy Wadge ("Lifeline", "Rewind"), along with production from Jamie Scott, Rami Yacoub and Steve Mac.

Background
Westlife recorded the album over an 18-month period and were "inspired by the challenges" of that time, a reference to the COVID-19 pandemic. In a statement, the band described the album as "uplifting", explaining that it "captures the mood of the moment" and has "moments of reflection and is about new beginnings, hope and looking to the future".

Critical reception

RTÉ editor Alan Corr called the album "another confection of airy, midtempo electro pop [...] earnest ballads and soft-focus pop anthems [...]  They sound mostly reinvigorated on a set of 13 new songs that sees them further embrace grown-up pop and invite fresh song-writing talent on board to varying degrees of success."

Track listing

Personnel
 Matt Holyoak – photography (Luttrellstown Castle, Dublin)
 Salvador Design – design
 Mark Feehily – art design

Charts

Weekly charts

Year-end charts

Certifications

See also
List of UK top-ten albums in 2021

References

2021 albums
East West Records albums
Westlife albums